The 1971-72 NBA season was the Rockets' 5th season in the NBA and 1st season in the city of Houston following their relocation from San Diego, where the franchise played its first four seasons prior to moving to becoming the first NBA franchise in Texas.

Offseason

Draft picks

Roster

Regular season

Season standings

Record vs. opponents

Game log

References

Houston
Houston Rockets seasons